Andreas Andreou Kantilos (born 20 April 1964) is a Cypriot former professional footballer who played as a right winger.

Honours
Omonia
 Cypriot First Division: 1980–81, 1981–82, 1982–83, 1983–84, 1984–85, 1986–87, 1988–89, 1992–93
 Cypriot Cup: 1980–81, 1981–82, 1982–83, 1987–88, 1990–91, 1993–94
 Cypriot Super Cup: 1980, 1981, 1982, 1983, 1987, 1988, 1989, 1991, 1994

References

1964 births
Living people
Cypriot footballers
AC Omonia players
Cypriot First Division players
Association football wingers
Cyprus international footballers
Sportspeople from Nicosia